Sabor da Paixão (English: The Taste of Passion) is a Brazilian telenovela produced and broadcast by TV Globo in 2002 and 2003.

Cast

References

External links 
  
 Sabor da Paixão at Memória Globo 
 

2002 telenovelas
Brazilian telenovelas
2002 Brazilian television series debuts
2003 Brazilian television series endings
TV Globo telenovelas
Portuguese-language telenovelas